Princess Lavinia Mata-ʻo-Tāone, Lady Maʻafu (2 April 1952 - 22 June 2018) was a member of the Tongan Royal family.  She was the third daughter of Prince Fatafehi Tuʻipelehake.

Biography 
Lavinia Mata-ʻo-Tāone was born in Nukuʻalofa on 4 April 1952, the third daughter of Prince Fatafehi Tuʻipelehake and Princess Melenaite Tupoumoheofo Veikune.  Her grandmother, Queen Sālote Tupou III, gave her the name "Mata-ʻo-Tāone" after a kie hingoa passed down from Princess Lavinia Māhanga.  She is a niece of King Tāufaʻāhau Tupou IV, and a cousin of Kings George Tupou V and Tupou VI.

Lavinia married Siosaʻia Lausiʻi, who later inherited the title of Maʻafu Tukuiʻaulahi and its estates of Vaini and Tokomololo.  They had two children, Tevita ʻUnga and Lavinia Fangaʻaka.

Lavinia spent much time in Auckland, New Zealand.  She died there on 22 June 2018 at the age of 66.  She was brought back to Tonga on 29 June for the funeral.  After the King and other members of the royal family received the funeral cortege at Fuaʻamotu International Airport, she lay in state overnight at the royal villa in Matatoa.  Fourteen churches attended the prayer vigil held at the villa.  She was buried on the following day at Langi ko Huelo ʻo Hangai Tokelau in Tokomololo.  The people of Vaini observed 10 days of mourning, with a sacred kava ceremony (pongipongi tapu) held at Ongokie Residence.

Ancestry

References 

1952 births
2018 deaths
Tongan royalty
People from Nukuʻalofa
Tongan expatriates in New Zealand
20th-century Tongan women
21st-century Tongan women